The 1989–90 División de Honor Juvenil de Fútbol, also known as Superliga Juvenil was the fourth season since its establishment.

League table

See also
1990 Copa del Rey Juvenil

External links
 Royal Spanish Football Federation website
Arquero-Arba Futbolme
Mundo Deportivo

1989
Juvenil